Birsa Seva Dal (BSD)  is a political group in India. BSD demanded a separate Chhotanagpur state. The party had Christian influences. It was founded in 1967 by Lalit Kuzur. The general secretary was Moses Guria.

In 1967–1969, BSD was engaged in agitation for the expulsion of non-Chhotanagpuris from the area. BSD later left their methods, but was disintegrated in conflicts. They were instrumental in fighting for the rights of the tribals for proper and legitimate compensation of their lands in village lohajimi area, which was to be displaced on account of construction of  dam in the area, the project was later abandoned .

References

Political parties in Jharkhand
Political parties established in 1967
1967 establishments in Bihar
Memorials to Birsa Munda